The 2000 Washington State Cougars football team represented Washington State University as a member of the Pacific-10 Conference during the 2000 NCAA Division I-A football season. Led by 12th-year head coach Mike Price, the Cougars compiled an overall record of 4–7 with a mark of 2–6 in conference play, placing in a three-way tie for eighth the Pac-10. Washington State played home games on campus at Martin Stadium in Pullman, Washington.

Schedule

References

Washington State
Washington State Cougars football seasons
Washington State Cougars football